SF12 is a science fiction anthology edited by Judith Merril first published in 1968.

Stories in SF12
Introduction by Judith Merril
The Cinemagicians by Tuli Kupferberg
In Seclusion by Harvey Jacobs
The Food Farm by Kit Reed
Gogol's Wife by Tommaso Landolfi
The Balloon by Donald Barthelme
The Cloud-Sculptors of Coral D by J. G. Ballard
Luana by Gilbert Thomas
W-A-V-E-R by Tuli Kupferberg
During the Jurassic by John Updike
The Fall of Frenchy Steiner by Hilary Bailey
Light of Other Days by Bob Shaw
Beyond the Weeds by Peter Tate
The Primary Education of the Camiroi by R. A. Lafferty
When I Was Miss Dow by Sonya Dorman
A Vacation on Earth by Thomas M. Disch
Confluence by Brian W. Aldiss
from "Journal From Ellipsia" by Hortense Calisher
An Ornament to His Profession by Charles L. Harness
Narrow Valley by R. A. Lafferty
They Do Not Always Remember by William Burroughs
The Winter Flies by Fritz Leiber
When I First Read... by Dick Allen
You: Coma: Marilyn Monroe by J. G. Ballard
And More Changes Still by Henri Michaux
The Other by Katherine MacLean
Chicken Icarus by Carol Emshwiller
In the Egg by Gunter Grass
The Star-Pit by Samuel R. Delany
Personal by Tuli Kupferberg

References
 Goodreads listing for SF12
 MIT Science Fiction Society's Library Pinkdex Entry for SF12

1968 anthologies
Science fiction anthologies
Delacorte Press books